Richard S. Brown (born March 31, 1946) is an American jurist and the retired chief judge of the Wisconsin Court of Appeals.  Brown served as a Court of Appeals judge from 1978 to 2015 and as chief judge from 2007; his service on the court concluded on July 31, 2015.

Life and career
Brown was born in Racine, Wisconsin; his father, Manny S. Brown, was an attorney and politician who later served in the Wisconsin State Assembly.  Richard Brown's son, Noah, is following in his dad's footsteps and is attending law school at Notre Dame. Despite dealing with high-functioning autism, Noah is currently holding the highest GPA in his graduating class. Richard Brown graduated from Miami University in 1968 and the University of Wisconsin Law School in 1971.  He served as an assistant district attorney in Racine County from 1971 until 1973, when he entered private practice in Oshkosh, Wisconsin, specializing in commercial litigation.  In 1978, Brown was elected to a judgeship on the newly created Wisconsin Court of Appeals, serving in the court's Waukesha-based District II.  At the time of his election, Brown was the youngest judge serving in Wisconsin's courts.  In 1983, Brown was appointed presiding judge of District II.  Also in 1983, Brown, who is hearing-impaired, became the first judge to use a real-time, computerized transcription system in a Wisconsin courtroom.

In 1990, Brown challenged Wisconsin Supreme Court Justice Donald Steinmetz, a conservative incumbent, in his reelection bid.  After a contentious campaign, Brown was defeated in the April general election, despite receiving considerable support and the endorsement of the Milwaukee Journal.  Brown continued to serve on the Court of Appeals; in May 2007, he was named the court's chief judge and assumed that office on August 1.

On February 2, 2015, Brown announced his retirement from the Court of Appeals, effective August 2.

See also
List of first minority male lawyers and judges in Wisconsin

References

|-

Politicians from Racine, Wisconsin
Politicians from Oshkosh, Wisconsin
Wisconsin Court of Appeals judges
Wisconsin lawyers
Miami University alumni
University of Wisconsin Law School alumni
1946 births
Living people